Ian Hyslop is a retired British rower who competed for Great Britain.

Rowing career
Hyslop was part of the lightweight coxless four that reached the final and finished fifth at the 1977 World Rowing Championships in Amsterdam.

References

Living people
British male rowers
Year of birth missing (living people)